Small Fry is a 2011 American computer animated short film written and directed by Angus MacLane. It was shown in theaters with The Muppets on November 23, 2011.

Small Fry is the second short in the Toy Story Toons series, based on the characters from the Toy Story feature films. The short involves Buzz getting trapped at a fast food restaurant, where there is a support group for discarded kids' meal toys from over the years, with a kids' meal toy version of Buzz taking his place.

Plot
One night at fast-food chicken restaurant Poultry Palace, Bonnie is disappointed to receive a Zurg belt buckle as her kids' meal toy, as the restaurant ran out of Mini Buzz Lightyear toys. In a nearby display cabinet, a Mini Buzz Lightyear complains to a Mini Zurg that they will never be played with, but Mini Zurg prefers to stay.

After eating dinner, Bonnie goes to play in the ball pit with Rex and Buzz Lightyear, whom she brought along. Seizing a chance to be played with, Mini Buzz sneaks out of the display cabinet, climbs into the ball pit, and pulls Buzz under the balls to take his place. Bonnie's mother packs the toys in her bag, unaware that Mini Buzz was not the real Buzz.

Mini Buzz successfully fools Rex into thinking he is the real Buzz and that he was shrunk by the plastic in the ball pit, though when they return home, the other toys instantly realize he is an imposter. Meanwhile, Buzz emerges from the balls and discovers he was left behind at the restaurant, which is now closed.

While trying to escape, Buzz discovers a storage room where a support group for abandoned fast food toys is being held, led by a mermaid toy named Neptuna.

The support group thinks Buzz is another victim of abandonment and he is forced to take part in the meeting. During a reenactment therapy session, Buzz meets Gary Grappling Hook, a toy grappling hook and a member of the group, and he uses him to escape. Back at Bonnie's house, the other toys demand Mini Buzz to reveal Buzz's whereabouts, and then begin devising a plan to break into Poultry Palace and save him.

However, Buzz soon finds his way home and returns, confronting Mini Buzz about his behavior. Mini Buzz is then seen at the support group opening up to the others, with Buzz now accompanying him as his sponsor. In a post-credits scene, Mini Zurg is left with the electronic belt buckle as his sole companion, much to his delight.

Voice cast

 Tim Allen as Buzz Lightyear
 Teddy Newton as Mini Buzz Lightyear
 Tom Hanks as Woody
 Joan Cusack as Jessie
 Estelle Harris as Mrs. Potato Head
 Wallace Shawn as Rex
 John Ratzenberger as Hamm
 Jane Lynch as Neptuna
 Angus MacLane as T-Bone, Super Pirate, Kangaroo Canoe, Funky Monk, Gary Grappling Hook
 Timothy Dalton as Mr. Pricklepants
 Peter Sohn as Recycle Ben
 Emily Hahn as Bonnie
 Lori Alan as  Bonnie's mom, Tae-Kwon Doe
 Josh Cooley as Cashier, Lizard Wizard
 Jess Harnell as Mini Zurg, Vlad the Engineer
 Bret Parker as DJ Blu-Jay
 Emily Forbes as Roxy Boxy
 Kitt Hirasaki as Nervous Sys-Tim
 Carlos Alazraqui as Koala Kopter
 Bob Bergen as Condorman
 Jason Topolski as Ghost Burger, Pizza Bot
 Jim Ward as Franklin

Production notes
The "Condorman" toy is a reference to the Disney live action comedy/adventure film Condorman (1981); in an interview, director Angus MacLane said, "I'm hoping for a very small sub set of the Disney animation fans to be stoked that there is actually a Condorman toy. Maybe it will stir up some buzz about a gritty re boot."

Release
This short premiered with the theatrical release of The Muppets, on November 23, 2011.

Home media
As of July 2012, Small Fry is available as a digital download on Amazon Video, and iTunes. The short was released on November 9, 2012, on the DVD and Blu Ray of Pixar Short Films Collection, Volume 2. It is also on the Toy Story of Terror! Blu Ray, released on August 19, 2014.

References

External links

 
 
 

2011 films
2011 computer-animated films
2010s American animated films
2010s animated short films
Films scored by Henry Jackman
Films directed by Angus MacLane
Pixar short films
Films with screenplays by John Lasseter
Toy Story
Films about dolls
2010s English-language films